Day of Days is a 2016 American drama film directed by Kim Bass and starring Tom Skerritt and Claudia Zevallos.  The film is loosely based on Bass's grandfather, Clarence Bass.

Cast
Tom Skerritt as Walter Raymond Leland
Claudia Zevallos as Marisol

Production
The film was shot in Los Angeles in 12 days from late February to early March 2015.  Filming wrapped in April 2015.

Release
The film premiered on November 4, 2016, at the 11th Women's International Film & Arts Festival in Miami.

Accolades
Skerritt and Zevallos won best actor awards at the Women's International Film & Arts Festival.

References

External links
 
 

American drama films
2016 drama films
Films shot in Los Angeles
2010s English-language films
2010s American films